Health insurance in China in 2019 was the fastest-growing category in the insurance industry in China. Health premiums rose by 23% in the first 10 months of 2018.  It is expected that health premiums will reach an all-time high of  billion (US$ billion) for the year. Ping An Insurance, the China Life Insurance Company, New China Life Insurance and China Pacific Insurance Company are the biggest players with 42% total market share in 2017. Out-of-pocket expenses are around a third of the total Chinese health spending.

History

New Rural Co-operative Medical Scheme (2002–present) 
As the old Rural Co-operative Medical Scheme (RCMS) ended, the need for affordable healthcare became urgent in rural China. The New Rural Co-operative Medical Care Scheme (NRCMS) was established to overhaul the healthcare system, particularly intended to make it more affordable for the rural poor. The NRCMS was initially outlined in Decisions on the strengthening of the rural health system issued in 2002 by CCP Central Committee, the highest decision-making authority in China. Pilots started in 2003, followed by fast expansion. By 2008, more than 90% of total population was enrolled in NRCMS. In 2016, China's government decided to merge NRCMS with Urban Residents Basic Medical Scheme (URBMS) to create a universal basic medical scheme.

NRCMS is a voluntary insurance scheme subsidized by local and central government. NRCMS differs from RCMS in the following perspectives: Administration and risk-pooling is set at county level, much higher than NRCMS's village level. Funds of NRCMS are provided by local and central government (for poorer regions) together, which contrasts with the old RCMS that was almost completely funded by the Chinese government and extended universally across all parts of China. NRCMS covers expense in all level public healthcare facilities, though the rate varies by regions and by type of facilities, while RCMS provided access to the barefoot doctors only.

The World Health Organization (WHO) summarized the success of NRCMS: the NRCMS rapidly expanded, with an increasing service bundle. It provided better access to higher quality service, and partly controlled medical costs. NRCMS is appropriate and convenient for China's enormous number of migrant workers who used to have limited access to healthcare.

However, there are some difficulties that undermine the scheme's effectiveness in reducing out-of-pocket medical costs. To begin with, the benefit package of NRCMS is mostly limited to catastrophic and inpatient care. While these costs are covered, most outpatient visits requires substantial individual payment. Secondly, the reimbursement rate varies across level of healthcare facilities, increasing the cost of high-level hospital visit. The details of the NRCMS show that patients benefit most from the NRCMS at a local level. If patients go to a small hospital or clinic in their local town, the scheme will cover from 70–80% of their bill, but if they go to a county one, the percentage of the cost being covered falls to about 60%, and if they need specialist help in a large modern city hospital, they have to bear most of the cost themselves, as the scheme would cover only about 30% of the bill. Furthermore, a fee-for service structure in the healthcare system provides incentives for healthcare providers to prescribe medicine or perform treatment in excess than is necessary to treat the patient. In addition, NRCMS reduces the actual cost of a medical service, but patients prefer to purchase more medical services in response to the reduced cost, offsetting the benefits of NRCMS. Those who are poor or in poorer regions benefit less from NRCMS, causing inequality.

Urban Employee Basic Medical Insurance (1999–present) 
Before 1978, urban residents are covered by Labor Insurance and Government Insurance which demanded small out-of-pocket payments. After then Chinese economic reforms, the cost of healthcare in China rose rapidly. Many urban employees lost their healthcare insurance due to reforms in state-owned-enterprises. As a result, urban areas saw a rising need for access to affordable healthcare. In 1997, the CCP Central Committee and China State Council issued universal healthcare reform guidelines, an important part of which is to establish medical scheme in urban areas. Urban Employee Basic Medical Insurance and Urban Residents Basic Medical Insurance was created to cover healthcare expense for urban working residents and non-working residents respectively.

In 1998, Urban Employee Basic Medical Insurance (UEBMI) was introduced to provide healthcare access to urban working and retired employees in public and private sectors as well. The UEBMI is administered at municipal level, higher than NRCMS. The UEBMI is funded by 8% deductions from employees' wages; of which 6% are paid by employers and 2% by employees, however these rates can vary by municipality. It differs from other types of insurance schemes in that UEBMI is mandatory.

Urban Residents Basic Medical Insurance (2007–present) 
In 2007, Urban Residents Basic Medical Insurance (URBMI) started to provide healthcare access to urban residents that are not covered by UEBMI: children, students in schools, colleges and universities and other non-working urban residents. URBMI was firstly piloted in 2007, and became nationwide in 2010. In 2015, 376 million urban residents (over 95%) took part in URBMI.

URBMI is a government-subsidized, household-level voluntary medical insurance, administered at municipal level. Additional government contributions are given to undeveloped central and western regions, and poor or disabled individuals. Research showed that URBMI helped improve healthcare utilization and residents' health conditions, especially for low-income residents. Studies also suggested that URBMI was a step towards a universal healthcare system.

References

China
Healthcare in China